Richard Andrew Zemlak (born March 3, 1963) is a Canadian former professional ice hockey forward who played 5 seasons in the National Hockey League for the Quebec Nordiques, Minnesota North Stars, Pittsburgh Penguins and Calgary Flames.  He currently works as a realtor in Lakeville, Minnesota. Zemlak also played for Klagenfurter AC in Austria for a brief time in 1990/91.

Playing career
Zemlak was drafted in the 10th Round, 209th overall by the St. Louis Blues in the 1981 NHL Entry Draft.

When asked about Zemlak, Herb Brooks commented on his strong work ethic, "He always brought his lunch bucket".

Career statistics

External links 

Profile at hockeydraftcentral.com

1963 births
Calgary Flames players
Canadian ice hockey forwards
Fredericton Express players
Ice hockey people from Saskatchewan
Kalamazoo Wings (1974–2000) players
Living people
Medicine Hat Tigers players
Milwaukee Admirals (IHL) players
Minnesota North Stars players
Montana Magic players
Muskegon Lumberjacks players
Nanaimo Islanders players
People from Wynyard, Saskatchewan
Pittsburgh Penguins players
Quebec Nordiques players
St. Louis Blues draft picks
Salt Lake Golden Eagles (CHL) players
Spokane Flyers players
Toledo Goaldiggers players
Winnipeg Warriors (1980–1984) players
People from Lakeville, Minnesota
Canadian expatriate ice hockey players in the United States